Shyrone Stith (born April 2, 1978) is a former running back in the National Football League for the Jacksonville Jaguars and Indianapolis Colts.  He played college football at Virginia Tech and was drafted in the seventh round of the 2000 NFL Draft.

1978 births
Living people
American football running backs
Jacksonville Jaguars players
Indianapolis Colts players
Virginia Tech Hokies football players

Football player for Virginia Tech